Backspacer may refer to:

Backspacer, an album by Pearl Jam
Backspacer Tour, a tour to promote the Pearl Jam album
Backspacer (Supergroove album)